Events in the year 1847 in Belgium.

Incumbents

Monarch: Leopold I
Prime Minister: Barthélémy de Theux de Meylandt (to 12 August); Charles Rogier (from 12 August)

Events

 7 June – Théâtre des Galeries opens in Brussels.
 8 June – Partial legislative elections.
 20 June – Galeries Royales Saint-Hubert shopping arcade opened in Brussels.
 1 July – Opening of the public exhibition of the products of national industry in Brussels.
 9 August – Antwerp–Ghent railway line completed.
 27 September – Premonstratensians return to Postel Abbey.

Publications
Periodicals
 Annales parlementaires de Belgique
 Bulletins de l'Académie Royale des Sciences, des Lettres et des Beaux-Arts de Belgique (Brussels, M. Hayez), vol. 14.
 Messager des sciences historiques (Ghent, Léonard Hebbelynck).
 Revue de Bruxelles

Exhibitions
 J.B.A.M. Jobard, Exposition de l'industrie Belge 1847
 Catalogue des produits de l'industrie belge admis à l'exposition de 1847

Scholarship
 André Dumont, Mémoire sur les terrains Ardennais et Rhénan de l'Ardenne, du Rhin, du Brabant et du Condros (Brussels, Hayez)
 Émile Louis Victor de Laveleye, L'Histoire des rois francs

Literature
 Tegenwoordig België (Liberalen, Katholyken en Vlaemsche-beweging) door Een' Noord-Nederlander beoordeeld (Ghent, Snoeck-Ducaju en zoon); reprinted from De Gids.
 Hippoliet Van Peene, "De Vlaamse Leeuw", song set to music by Karel Miry
 Hippoliet Van Peene, Willem van Dampierre, historical drama

Art and architecture

Buildings
 Jean-Pierre Cluysenaar's Galeries Royales Saint-Hubert completed

Paintings
 Antoine Wiertz, La Belle Rosine

Births
 9 March – Martin Pierre Marsick, composer (died 1924)
 9 April – Léon Mignon, sculptor (died 1898)
 11 May – Godefroid Kurth, historian (died 1916)
 27 August – Édouard Descamps, jurist and politician (died 1933)
 31 August – Arthur Verhaegen, architect and politician (died 1917)
 3 October – Frantz Jourdain, architect (died 1935)

Deaths
 19 March – Karel Lodewijk Ledeganck (born 1805), writer
 4 April – Julie du Bosch (born 1797), social reformer

References

 
1840s in Belgium
Belgium